NFL GameDay is the first video game in the NFL GameDay series of American football video games, and was released in 1995 on the PlayStation video game console as a competitor to the Madden NFL football game series. It was developed by Sony Interactive Studios America and published by Sony Computer Entertainment.

The cover athlete is William Floyd.

Gameplay
The game makes use of motion capture for its animations.

Reception 

The game was a success for Sony, selling over 300,000 copies by March 1996 and briefly holding the record for best-selling PlayStation game in the United States until it was overtaken by Resident Evil later that year. By the end of 1996, GameDay had sold over  units worldwide.

It was also a critical success. Both of the sports reviewers for Electronic Gaming Monthly gave the game a 9 out of 10, saying it "could very well be the Madden killer that everyone is waiting for." Scary Larry of GamePro called it "the best football CD to date", citing the graphics, accurate gameplay performance of each individual player, appropriately sized sprites, and comprehensive sound effects. A reviewer for Next Generation found that in addition to the comprehensive teams, stadiums, and playbooks, NFL Gameday benefited from truly modern graphics, animation, and sounds, as well as an innovative level of control over individual players and an AI which creates an authentic football experience. He criticized the unrealistic results of breaking up a pass, but concluded, "NFL Gameday isn't the perfect football game, but it is the best football game ever made, so far." David Hodgson of Maximum remarked that the graphics suffer from jerky animation and a general last-generation appearance, but are outweighed by the outstanding gameplay and reliable player AI. He summarized that the game "plays quite a mean game of American football without ever becoming bogged down in horrific amounts of tactical decisions."

GamePro awarded it Best Sports Game of 1995. Next Generation ranked it number 28 on their 1996 "Top 100 Games of All Time", citing its authentic football gameplay and looks, and its combination of accessibility and depth. It was a finalist for the Computer Game Developers Conference's 1996 "Best Sports Game" Spotlight Award, but lost the prize to NHL 97.

In 1998, Next Generation listed NFL GameDay as number 43 on their "Top 50 Games of All Time", commenting that, "Truly, this is the football game that appeals to both the hardcore and the masses."

Reviews
Electric Playground - November 3, 1995
Game Players - January 1996
Video Games & Computer Entertainment - February 1996
IGN - Nov 25, 1996
Game Revolution - June 4, 2004

References

1995 video games
NFL GameDay video games
PlayStation (console) games
PlayStation (console)-only games
Video games developed in the United States